Gustavo Alfonso Dulanto Sanguinetti (born 5 September 1995) is a Peruvian professional footballer who plays as a central defender for Riga.

Club career

Universitario
Dulanto was born in Lima, and finished his formation with Rosario Central. On 3 September 2014 he returned to his home country, after agreeing to a contract with Universitario.

Dulanto made his senior debut on 1 May 2015, starting and being sent off in a 1–0 away loss against Unión Comercio. He scored his first goal for the club on 2 August, netting the first in a 1–1 home draw against Real Garcilaso.

UTC
On 22 December 2016, after featuring rarely during the campaign, Dulanto moved to fellow league team UTC Cajamarca. In his only season at the club, he scored seven goals in 41 appearances as the club reached the Finals of the Torneo de Verano.

Real Garcilaso
On 16 December 2017, Dulanto joined Real Garcilaso. He was also a regular starter at his new side, also appearing in the 2018 Copa Libertadores.

Boavista
On 7 July 2019, Dulanto moved abroad and joined Portuguese Primeira Liga side Boavista on a two-year contract. He made his debut abroad on 31 October, replacing Gustavo Sauer in a 2–0 home win over S.C. Braga.

Dulanto scored his first goal for Boavista on 7 March 2020, netting the equalizer in a 1–1 draw at C.D. Tondela. Ahead of the 2020–21 season, he was deemed surplus to requirements, and terminated his contract on 1 December.

Sheriff Tiraspol
On 6 February 2021, Dulanto signed for Moldavian club Sheriff Tiraspol. In the 2021–22 UEFA Champions League, he was an undisputed first-choice as Sheriff became the first Moldovan team to qualify for the group stages of the competition after a 3–0 aggregate win over Dinamo Zagreb. They were drawn into Group D to face Inter Milan, Real Madrid and Shakhtar Donetsk, with Sheriff winning their opening group game, 2–0 against Shakhtar Donetsk, before following it up with a  2–1 away victory over Real Madrid at the Santiago Bernabéu on 28 September 2021, with Sébastien Thill scoring the winning goal in the 89th minute; Dulanto played the full 90 minutes on both matches.

Personal life
Dulanto's father, Alfonso, was also a footballer.

Career statistics

References

External links

1995 births
Living people
Footballers from Lima
Peruvian footballers
Peruvian expatriate footballers
Association football defenders
Peruvian Primera División players
Primeira Liga players
Moldovan Super Liga players
Club Universitario de Deportes footballers
Universidad Técnica de Cajamarca footballers
Real Garcilaso footballers
Boavista F.C. players
FC Sheriff Tiraspol players
Peruvian expatriate sportspeople in Argentina
Peruvian expatriate sportspeople in Portugal
Peruvian expatriate sportspeople in Moldova
Expatriate footballers in Argentina
Expatriate footballers in Portugal
Expatriate footballers in Moldova
Peruvian people of Italian descent